, DBA  Unlimited, is a Japanese independent music company that represents Western alternative artists and labels in Japan, such as the Beggars Group (4AD/XL/Matador/Rough Trade), Domino Records, V2 Records, Brassland, Virgin Music Label & Artist Services and PIAS UK Distribution. Artists signed to Hostess include Adele, Radiohead, Arctic Monkeys, Warpaint, Mogwai, Theme Park, The xx, Bon Iver and Vampire Weekend. It was founded in 2000 by Andrew "Plug" Lazonby, an alumnus of the Royal College of Music.

References

Japanese record labels
Record labels established in 2000
Record label distributors